Hüsnü Savman (18 August 1908 – 8 August 1948) was a Turkish footballer. He competed in the men's tournament at the 1936 Summer Olympics.

References

External links
 

1908 births
1948 deaths
Turkish footballers
Turkey international footballers
Olympic footballers of Turkey
Footballers at the 1936 Summer Olympics
People from Gönen
Association football defenders
Beşiktaş J.K. footballers